MPWH (Meeting People With Herpes) is an American-based international Herpes dating community. MPWH offers an exclusive platform for positive singles who are living with Herpes (HSV-1 and HSV-2) to find support, friendship and love.

History 

In 2015, MPWH launched its apps for iOS and Android devices, which provide full functionality as its pc site and mobile site. Currently Michelle Lee is MPWH APP co-founder.

MPWH app was announced by Cosmopolitan UK as a dating app for people with Herpes in September, 2015.

MPWH started to charge its members from March, 2016 PT (Pacific time) for providing a serious and meaningful dating environment.

In 2018, MPWH was incorporated into SuccessfulMatch.com.

Overview 

The MPWH business frame is based on a membership system, people with Herpes create profiles with anonymous usernames and join in free of charge. Members have the options to hide or open their profiles or photos to others.

The community supports features, such as Latest Activities, Browse, SPARK, Private Album, Winks, Connections, Messages, Blog, etc.

Matching 
The MPWH uses Tinder-style matching function called "SPARK" for members finding their matches. "SPARK" offers members' photos with age, gender, location to swipe and encourage members upload photos to enjoy swiping. Members swipe left 'pass' and swipe right to 'like'. If members like each other, MPWH will let them know.

References

Online dating services of the United States
Internet properties established in 1999
Herpes
1999 establishments in the United States